Super-Team Family is a comic book anthology series published by DC Comics from 1975 to 1978 that lasted for 15 issues. It included a mix of original and reprinted stories.

Publication history 
Super-Team Family began publication with an October–November 1975 cover date. DC Comics published several other ... Family titles concurrent with Super-Team Family including The Superman Family (1974–1982), Batman Family (1975–1978), and Tarzan Family (1975–1976). As a rule, DC's ... Family titles contained mostly reprints and featured a higher page count and higher price than DC's normal books.

The original intention of Super-Team Family was to be a "home" for original story team-ups without Batman, as editor Gerry Conway wrote in the letters column of issue #1. The first issue was only all-reprints due to scheduling problems, according to Conway. By issue #3 "economics had changed", and readers were informed that the series would go all-reprints with #4, edited by E. Nelson Bridwell. As of #8 the editor changed again, and Super-Team Family returned to an original-story format, with the occasional reprint seen in back-up stories.

A Creeper/Wildcat team-up in #2 and a Flash/Hawkman tale in #3 were the only new stories in the first seven issues of the title. The Challengers of the Unknown were the lead feature in issues #8–10 in a series of new stories by writer Steve Skeates and artists James Sherman and Jack Abel. Reprinted backup stories were eliminated as of #11 which saw the start of a four-issue serial written by Gerry Conway, starring the Atom teaming up with various other DC characters.
  
DC management liked the sales results of later issues of the series and saw the financial advantage of lowering the page count. Rather than redefining the nature of the "... Family" titles, they opted to create a new series. Super-Team Family ended its run with issue #15 (March–April 1978), and was replaced a few months later with the Superman team-up title DC Comics Presents (July 1978).

After the cancellation of Super-Team Family, a Supergirl/Doom Patrol team-up by Gerry Conway and artist Arvell Jones originally scheduled to appear in the series was published in The Superman Family #191–193 (Sept.–Oct. 1978/Jan.–Feb. 1979).

The issues

Collected editions
Part of the series has been collected in a trade paperback:
 Secret Society of Super Villains Volume 2 includes Super-Team Family #13–14, 328 pages, May 2012,

References

External links
 
 Super-Team Family at Mike's Amazing World of Comics

1978 comics endings
Comics by Dennis O'Neil
Comics by Gerry Conway
Defunct American comics
Team-up comics